The Sint Eustatius national football team is the national association football team of the Caribbean island of Sint Eustatius. It is a not member of the Caribbean Football Union, CONCACAF, or FIFA and therefore cannot compete in tournaments sanctioned by these organizations. It is under the auspices of the Statia Football Association.

History
Formerly Sint Eustatius was represented in international football by the Netherlands Antilles national football team until the country was dissolved on 10 October 2010 and Sint Eustatius became a separate Special Municipality. Since 2004 Sint Eustatius has played at least nine international friendlies against neighboring island Saba in a series of inter-island matches. 

The national football team of Bonaire, another island that holds the status of Special Municipality within the Kingdom of the Netherlands, has been a member of the CFU and CONCACAF since 2013 through the support of the Dutch KNVB, leaving open the possibility for Sint Eustatius membership in the governing bodies. In August 2021 the KNVB, joined by Bert Zuurman and former Aruba national team coach Elvis Albertus, organized a football course on the island.

Stadium
The team's home stadium is the Cottage Ball Park in the capital of Oranjestad, the only football venue on the island.

List of international matches
As of 6 May 2011.

References

External links
RSSSF List of Results
National Football Teams profile

Caribbean national association football teams
CONCACAF teams not affiliated to FIFA